Hyett is a surname. Notable people with the surname include:

Charles Hyett, English politician
Francis "Frank" Hyett (1882–1919), Australian politician, trade unionist, cricketer and anti-conscription activist
Jack Hyett (1915–2001), Australian teacher, broadcaster, author, naturalist and ornithologist
P. J. Hyett (born 1982/83), American software developer, and co-founder of GitHub
William Henry Hyett (1795–1877), British Liberal Member of Parliament representing Stroud
Willoughby Hyett Dickinson, 1st Baron Dickinson (1859–1943), British Liberal Party politician

See also
Ayette
Hewett (disambiguation)
Hewitt (disambiguation)
Houyet
Hyatt 10